Carsten Ball and Travis Rettenmaier were the defending champions. Ball chose not to compete this year and Rettenmaier chose to compete in Belgrade instead.
Jamie Baker and James Ward won in the final 6–3, 6–4, against Bobby Reynolds and Fritz Wolmarans.

Seeds

Draw

Draw

References
 Main Draw
 Qualifying Draw

Tail Savannah Challenger - Doubles
2010 Doubles